Myx Music Awards 2014 is the 9th installment of the Myx Music Awards. Just like the MMA 2012 and MMA 2013, fans can vote online through Myx website, Facebook and Twitter. Awards night was held on March 26, 2014. Gloc-9 leads other artists of having the most number of nominations with seven nominations. The song "Magda" won four awards making Gloc-9 and Rico Blanco the biggest winners of the awards night.

Nominees and winners
Winners are in bold text.

Favorite Music Video 
"Chinito" – Yeng Constantino (Director: Avid Liongoren)
"HKM" – Callalily (Director: Treb Montreras II)
"Ikot-Ikot" – Sarah Geronimo (Directors: Paul Basinillo and Sarah Geronimo)
"Ilusyon" – Abra featuring Arci Muñoz (Director: Raymond "Abra" Abracosa)
"Magda" – Gloc-9 featuring Rico Blanco (Director: J. Pacena II) (Winner)

Favorite Song
"Buko" – Jireh Lim
"Chinito" – Yeng Constantino
"Ikot-ikot" – Sarah Geronimo
"Magda" – Gloc-9 featuring Rico Blanco (Winner)
"Nasa Iyo Na Ang Lahat" – Daniel Padilla

Favorite Artist
Callalily
Daniel Padilla
Gloc-9
Sarah Geronimo (Winner)
Yeng Constantino

Favorite Female Artist
Jonalyn Viray
KZ Tandingan
Sarah Geronimo
Yeng Constantino (Winner)
Zia Quizon

Favorite Male Artist
Abra
Bamboo (Winner)
Daniel Padilla
Gloc-9
Sam Concepcion

Favorite Group
Banda ni Kleggy
Callalily
Chicosci
Parokya ni Edgar (Winner)
Sponge Cola

Favorite Mellow Video
"Help Me Get Over" – Jonalyn Viray (Director: Cesar Apolinario)
"Luna" – Up Dharma Down (Director: Nic Reyes and Pong Ignacio)
"Magkabilang Mundo" – Jireh Lim (Director: Joyce Bernal) (Winner)
"Pansamantala" – Callalily (Director: Kean Cipriano)
"Take a Chance" – Luigi D'Avola (Director: Enzo Valdez)

Favorite Rock Video
"Better Days" – Franco (Director: Martin Rey Aviles)
"Carousel" – Bamboo (Director: Marla Ancheta) (Winner)
"Insekto" – Pedicab (Director: RA Rivera)
"Pick Your Poison" – Sponge Cola (Director: Jerico Catalan)
"Raspberry:Girl" – Chicosci (Director: RA Rivera)

Favorite Urban Video
"Hagdan" – Ron Henley featuring Kat Agarrado (Director: Patrick Edward Raymundo)
"Ilusyon" – Abra featuring Arci Muñoz (Director: Marla Ancheta)
"Magda" – Gloc-9 featuring Rico Blanco (Director: J. Pacena II) (Winner)
"Saludo" – Quest (Director: James Muleta)
"Tonight" – Jay R and Mica Javier (Director: Romson Niega)

Favorite New Artist
Banda ni Kleggy
Jireh Lim
KZ Tandingan (Winner)
Luigi D'Avola
Marion Aunor

Favorite Collaboration
"Ang Bagong Ako" – Greyhoundz featuring Loonie and Biboy Garcia
"Ang Parokya" – Parokya ni Edgar featuring Gloc-9 and Frank Magalona
"Darating" – BBS featuring Ney, Dello and Kleggy
"Dati" – Sam Concepcion, Tippy Dos Santos and Quest
"Magda" – Gloc-9 featuring Rico Blanco (Winner)

Favorite Remake
"Dreaming of You" – Juris (original: Selena)
"Forever" – Tom Rodriguez and Dennis Trillo (original: Passage)
"It Takes a Man and a Woman" – Sarah Geronimo (original: Teri DeSario) (Winner)
"Mahal na Mahal" – Sam Concepcion (original: Archie D.)
"Right Next to Me" – Kimpoy Feliciano (original: Whistle)

Favorite Media Soundtrack
"Carousel" – Bamboo  (from Globe Tattoo commercial) (Winner)
"Got to Believe" – Juris  (from Got to Believe)
"Help Me Get Over" – Jonalyn Viray  (from My Husband's Lover)
"It Takes a Man and a Woman" – Sarah Geronimo (from It Takes a Man and a Woman)
"Kaleidoscope World Forever More" – Elmo Magalona featuring Francis M. (from Oishi Endorser)

Favorite Guest Appearance in a Music Video
Enchong Dee – "Chinito" by Yeng Constantino
Enrique Gil – "Mr. Kupido" by Myrtle Sarrosa
Julie Anne San Jose – "Broken Heart" by Kaligta
Kathryn Bernardo – "Nasa Iyo Na Ang Lahat" by Daniel Padilla
Kim Chiu – "Discolamon" by Banda ni Kleggy (Winner)

Favorite Myx Celebrity VJ
Abra (Winner)
Alden Richards
apl.de.ap
Barbie Forteza
Carla Abellana

Favorite International Music Video
 "Best Song Ever" – One Direction  
 "Heart Attack" – Demi Lovato
 "Roar" – Katy Perry (Winner)
 "Royals" – Lorde
 "Wrecking Ball" – Miley Cyrus

Favorite K-Pop Video
"Everybody" – Shinee
"No More Dream" – BTS
"I Got a Boy" – Girls' Generation
"I'm Sorry" – CNBLUE
"Wolf" – Exo (Winner)

Myx Magna Award
Parokya ni Edgar (Winner)

References

External links
 Myx official site

Philippine music awards